Bjorn Fratangelo was the defending champion, but was not eligible to participate.
Kimmer Coppejans won this event, defeating 5th-seed Filip Peliwo 6–1, 6–4 in the final.

Seeds

Main draw

Finals

Top half

Section 1

Section 2

Bottom half

Section 3

Section 4

References
Main Draw

Boys' Singles
2012